Bakau LRT station is an elevated Light Rail Transit (LRT) station on the Sengkang LRT line East Loop in Rivervale, Sengkang, Singapore along Rivervale Drive between the junctions of Rivervale Street and Sengkang East Way. It is located near North Spring Primary School.

Etymology
The bakau (Malay for mangrove tree) wood was popularly used as a building foundation. The word "bakau" brings the idea of strong foundation.

History
The station opened on 18 January 2003, along with the rest of the Sengkang LRT line East Loop.

References

External links

Railway stations in Singapore opened in 2003
Light Rail Transit (Singapore) stations
LRT stations in Sengkang